György Lépes (1375 – 18 March 1442, Marosszentimre) was a Transylvanian Catholic Bishop.

Life 
Lépes was born in what is now Arad County to a noble family. He was the provost of Transylvania between 1403 and 1417, and was bishop from 1427 to 1442. In 1436, he invited James of the Marches as an inquisitor against the spread of the Hussite movement. In 1437, the Budai Nagy Antal revolt
broke out because of Lépes' regulations that ordered the serfs to pay the tithe in the new currency of golden coins 3 years after the peasants had silver coins (worth four times more), and also wanted to order the Orthodox Romanians to pay it. The 1438 uprising was brutally crushed by the nobles, and the three estate nations (Hungarian, Székely, and Saxon) concluded with the Union of Kápolna. In 1442, Lépes, while leading the fighting against the Turks at the battle of Hermannstadt, was killed.

Further reading 
 Bokor József (szerk.). Lépes, A Pallas nagy lexikona. Arcanum: FolioNET.  (1893–1897, 1998.). Hozzáférés ideje: 2009. szeptember 27.

References 
 Magyar életrajzi lexikon II. (L–Z).  Főszerk. Kenyeres Ágnes.   Budapest: Akadémiai.   1969.
 Magyar katolikus lexikon VII. (Klacs–Lond).   Főszerk. Diós István; szerk. Viczián János.   Budapest: Szent István Társulat.   2002.

1375 births
1442 deaths
15th-century Roman Catholic bishops
Gyorgy